Gangara thyrsis, commonly known as the giant redeye, is a species of butterfly belonging to the family Hesperiidae. It breeds on a number of palm species.

Description
The male and female are dark chocolate brown. With a forewing consisting of bright yellow semi-transparent quadrate spots disposed triangularly, the first is large and occupying half the cell, the second also large, obliquely beneath and partly beyond, the third small and obliquely above the second; above the last are three smaller spots obliquely before the apex, the two upper being geminated; in some specimens beneath the subapical spots is a small dot, and on the posterior margin another, both similar to the rest; cilia at posterior angle brownish-white; hindwing with the cilia at the anterior angle brownish white. Underside, forewing irrorated (sprinkled) with grey scales near the apex, posterior margin pale brownish-white, spots yellow as above; hindwing irrorated with grey scales in a series of bands across the wing.

The male of this species presents, on the upperside of each anterior wing, three lines of modified scales, namely, one along the posterior side of the median vein between the origins of its first and second branches, another on each side of the first median veinlet from the origin of this up to the second discal spot, and a third, also double, along an equal portion of the submedian vein, and a thick clothing of setae paler than the groundcolour at the base of the interno-median area, and a similar clothing of paler setae on the middle three-fourths of the sutural area ; and, on the underside, a conspicuous and equally long furry patch of pale fulvous coarse setae divided by the submedian vein.

Distribution and habitat
It is found in Sri Lanka and India.

Life cycle
The larva is greyish-white with a few ochreous dorsal spots and marks. From the body, a loose shaggy filamentous clothing consisting of pure wax is excreted, but which is easily rubbed off when handled, leaving the larva quite naked.

Food plants
The larvae feed on palms and canes including Cocos nucifera, Calamus pseudotenuis, Calamus rotang, Calamus thwaitesii, Phoenix loureirii, Licuala chinensis and Phoenix humilis. Has also been recorded on Zingiber officinale.

Gallery

References

Hesperiinae
Butterflies of Asia
Butterflies of Singapore
Butterflies of Indochina